The El Tawheed Mosque is a Sunni mosque in Amsterdam, Netherlands.

The foundation that manages the mosque was founded in 1986.  The mosque is on Jan Hanzenstraat in the Old-West section of Amsterdam. Aside from its normal function, the mosque is used for social work, and for lessons in the Arabic language. It also houses a book store and a publisher of religious videos and DVDs.

The mosque was in-part funded by the Saudi non-governmental organization al-Haramain Foundation.

Islamism association
The mosque at one time had been cited by the Dutch government as a potential propagator of extremism.  Mohammed Bouyeri the killer of Dutch film director Theo van Gogh attended the mosque.  The September 11 attacks pilots Mohammed Atta and Marwan al-Shehhi, along with Ramzi Binalshibh, the man accused of co-ordinating the attacks, met in 1999 during a conference on 'Islamic puritanism' held at the mosque.

See also

 List of mosques in the Netherlands
 Tawhid

References

External links
Website of El Tawheed Foundation 

Religious buildings and structures in Amsterdam
Hofstad Network
Mosques in the Netherlands
Mosque-related controversies in Europe